Skatoony (stylized as SkatoonY) is a children's live action/animated game show, pitting live-action kids against cartoons. The series was co-produced by Talent TV and FremantleMedia Animation (for the British version), Blink Studios (for the Arabic version), and Marblemedia with Smiley Guy Studios (for the North American version). The series used to air on Cartoon Network in the UK until 2017, with new episodes airing every Friday until the series cancellation in 2008. Skatoony has also aired as re-runs in the UK on Boomerang and Cartoon Network Too until the channel itself closed down in 2014. The show aired on Starz Kids & Family in the US until 2019.
Reruns were occasionally shown on Teletoon in Canada until August 5, 2017. It also aired on Boomerang in Australia and New Zealand.

The show is hosted by 'Chudd Chudders' (voiced by Rupert Degas in the UK and Jonathan Wilson in North America) and 'The Earl' (voiced by Lewis MacLeod in the UK and James Rankin in North America).

History
In 2001, Skatoony began as a competition microsite on the Cartoon Network UK website co-developed by James Fox and Brian Boyle, who the latter left Cartoon Network before the series premiered. In 2006, the first full-length Skatoony TV show premiered on the Cartoon Network UK channel. However, a few phone-in shows such as Skatoony Quizmas, Ready Steady Skatoony and Skatoony Truckatoony existed before as a sort of continuity during school holidays. These phone-in shows ended in 2005. The British version of Skatoony was filmed at MTV Studios at Camden and in London with schoolchildren from around the world auditioning as contestants.

According to creator James Fox, the process of producing a Skatoony episode was very complicated and developed over all of the series.

On February 9, 2009, Marblemedia announced they would be producing a North American version of the series Skatoony (in English and French). The Canadian adaptation, titled Skatoony North America to differentiate it from other adaptations follows the same format. The North American version of Skatoony is filmed in Toronto, while the French version is filmed in Montreal with a different set of contestants; however, the outcome of the animated contestants remains the same between both versions. Jonathan Wilson voices Chudd Chudders while James Rankin provides the voice of The Earl, and new addition to the North American release, a NA replacement for Skatoony boss Tony Eagle-Eyes (also voiced by Degas) named Charles La Puck, which is voiced by Jeff Lumby. A Middle Eastern adaptation of Skatoony debuted on April 5, 2011, on Cartoon Network Arabic. Original Skatoony creator James Fox serves as an executive producer for all Skatoony releases and met every single kid contestant on the show.

In addition to the British format, one contestant in each episode of Skatoony North America will be a guest contestant from a show from a Canadian animated series. Accordingly, a significant figure from the series will also be seen in the Skatoony opening sequence. Other children's series (including but not limited to shows on the Teletoon lineup) are often the subject of the questions asked on the shows. Guest contestants are taken from the following series:

A similar situation occurs in Skatoony Arabia where guest contestants were taken from the animated series, Freej instead. With the exception of Skatoony North America, all non-English language Skatoony releases uses animation footage from the original British version, which is why Tony Eagle Eyes are the hosts' boss instead of Charles La Puck.

Guest Contestants
Every episode (except "Space: The Final Souffle", "Pre-School Problem", and "It Could Be You!") has a guest contestant from shows from Total Drama and Jimmy Two-Shoes.

Guest contestant replacement
In Skatoony, the quizblock has 6 colored squares - green, red, pink, purple, blue and yellow. The children get the green, pink and blue squares (they sometimes move to the purple, red and yellow squares if two kid contestants remain in Round 3), and the cartoon contestants get the red, yellow and purple. The guest contestants take the place of a cartoon character from the UK version.  In the episode 'Skeleton Crew in Da House' in NA, Scabz was originally a contestant but he left before the 1st round and was replaced by Harold.

Season 1

Season 2

Note: The episodes "Space: The Final Souffle", "Pre-School Problem", and "It Could Be You!" are all skipped because they have no guest.

Season 3

Seasonal episodes

Factories in which eliminated contestants are ejected into

Season 1
1) "Knights and Daze" - Sandpaper Factory

2) "Invasion" - Dentist's Convention

3) "I Stink, Therefore I Am" - Manure Factory

4) "Pirates" - Sewage Factory

5) "Skeleton Crew in Da House" - Porcupine Sanctuary

6) "Xcquankly" - Mousetrap Factory

7) "To the Quiz Cave" - Really Hard Mattress Company

8) "Quizoo" - Africa, Australia, and The North Pole

9) "Hoo Loves Ya, Baby!" - 80's Disco Nightclub

10) "Quiziatori Gladihost" - Secondhand Sock Depot

11) "Superheroes" - Broken Glass Factory

12) "Dinosaur" - Liver and Onion/Chopped Liver & Tripe Ice Cream Factory / Tar Pits

13) "Hooray for Bollywood" - Rat Perfume Factory

Season 2
1) "Body Swap" - Concrete Pillow Factory

2) "Sports Academy" - Angry Pig World

3) "Space: The Final Souffle" - Planet Dung

4) "Pre-School Problem" - Used Nappy Dump / Dirty Diaper Factory (In US)

5) "Trash Talk" - Land o' Trash

6) "Vikings" - Toenail Warehouse

7) "Stop the Pop" - Faulty Bagpipe Superstore

8) "Inside Eagle Eyes/La Puck" - Miniature Village

9) "It Could Be You!" - Compost World

10) "I Spy, You Quiz" - Spikey Spike Factory / Spikey Spike Shipping

11) "Out to Sea" - Super GassyGut Beans Shipping

12) "Freakshow" - Fernando Fernando Fernando and Xcquankly's Freakshow Circus / Human-Animal Hybrid Genetics Lab

13) "Destination: Moon" - Galactic Garbage

Season 3
1) "TJ/CJ's Birthday" - Sweaty Footballer's Pants Depot / Faulty Bagpipe Superstore (UK Error)

2) "Amusement Park" - Rejected Hot Dog Meat Factory

3) "Follow that Quizblock" - Leftover School Dinners Dump

4) "Style Trial" - Pointy Pin Factory

5) "Pop Video" - Home for One Hit Wonders

6) "Quiz to the Future" - Broken Clock Factory / Tar Pits

7) "Broke Tony/Charles" - Worm World

8) "In Your Dreams" - Giant Frog Factory

9) "Unusual Suspects" - Gravy Recycling

10) "Café Le Quiz" - Hot Dog Factory

11) "Host of Doom" - Robo-World: Turning People Into Products for Over 20 Years

Seasonal episodes
1) "Halloween" - Rotten Pumpkin World

2) "Stoopid Santa" - Fake Holly Factory

Format
The show's format is that three child contestants and three cartoon character contestants, making 6 contestants in all, compete in a quiz show lasting three rounds. At the end of each of the first two rounds, the two lowest scoring contestants are eliminated. The first round is always Bang On! or Bogus?, a rapid-fire true-or-false questioning round; with "Bang On!" meaning true, and "Bogus!" meaning false. The last two rounds vary between episodes. As contestants are eliminated, they are usually catapulted out of their seats as the hosts (and the remaining contestants) sing "You're Outta Here!". The losing contestants are catapulted into a factory containing a nasty thing like 'Compost World' or 'Leftover School Dinners Dump' or 'Dirty Diaper Factory' or 'Concrete Pillow Factory', and then they are (sometimes) not seen for the remainder of the episode. Vignettes featuring eliminated animated contestants (and on occasion, eliminated child contestants) interacting with Chudd or the Earl (as well, on Skatoony North America, Charles La Puck, their boss [Tony Eagle-Eyes in the UK]) also appear during the progression of the show; in Skatoony North America, this extends to the web extras available on the Skatoony website. The first round always ends with having one live-kid and a cartoon contestant being eliminated.

At the end of the third round, only 1 of the 2 remaining contestants gets eliminated through ejection, based on who has the lowest score at the end of the round.  At the end of three rounds, the remaining contestant takes on the Skatoony Quiz Champ Challenge, where they must answer ten questions correctly in 90 seconds. After 45 seconds, the clock will temporarily stop, and Earl's Halfway Deal will be offered, trading in time for correct answers: in the UK version, deals offered were inconsistent in season 1, in seasons 2 and 3 of the UK version and all seasons of the NA version the deals offered were as follows depending on the player's score:
 3 points or less: 3 additional points in exchange for 25 seconds (20 seconds left)
 4-5 points: 2 additional points in exchange for 20 seconds (25 seconds left)
 6-7 points: 1 additional point in exchange for 10 seconds (35 seconds left)
 8 points or more: No deal is offered
If the contestant finishes with time remaining and gets ten questions right, the contestant wins a prize, offered at the start of each episode. If a contestant finishes with the ten correct answers in under 45 seconds, they are further honoured with being called "#1 Skatoony Quiz Champ Champion".

Note that the games used in each round and the contestants' interactions are based on the number of child contestants remaining, and that the game always ensures that a child contestant will always be the last remaining contestant. Sometimes, for the third round, it can be either 1 child vs 1 toon, or 2 children vs each other. In addition, it is typical for the second-round challenge to be rigged against an animated contestant, leading to their elimination as well.

In Skatoony North America, the prize for winning the Skatoony Quiz Champ Challenge in the first season is an iPod Touch; later seasons have refused to disclose the grand prize. Other merchandise from Teletoon shows are also awarded to the contestants for their participation.

In the British version, the Prizes were like this:
 Season 1: A Sony PSP (on two episodes it was a video iPod). In one episode it was turned into a frog.
 Season 2: A Nintendo Wii
 Season 3: An iPod Touch (on two episodes it was a Nintendo DS) In one episode it was a chocolate scale model of Tony Eagle Eys/Charles La Puck.

Rounds
Beyond Bang On! or Bogus? (used in the first round) and the Skatoony Quiz Champ Challenge (when one contestant remains), the following challenges have been used:

Round 1 challenges
 Bang On! or Bogus? (All Seasons [NA and UK]) - Chudd is gonna say a lot of silly stuff, some of it is true, but some of it is false. When the contestants think it's true, they say "Bang On!" And when the contestants think it's false, they say "Bogus".

Round 2 challenges
 Draw What You Hear, and Shout Out When You Know What You've Drawn! (All Seasons [NA and UK]) - Chudd will use words to describe what it is to be drawn, and contestants must infer what is being drawn from Chudd's instructions. Chudd will continue with the description until one contestant answers correctly. 
 Same Sound Name Round (Season 1 [NA and UK]) - Each contestant is given three placards, each depicting a picture corresponding to a particular word, with all three words rhyme with each other. Chudd's questions this round will have an answer that will either match or have the same pronunciation as one of these three placards. Contestants are only awarded points for presenting the correct placard: giving the correct answer verbally while presenting the wrong placard does not award points.
 Wear in the World? (Season 1 [NA and UK]) - Each contestant is given three hats, representing three countries. All of Chudd's questions this round have answers corresponding to one of these three countries, and contestants must wear the correct hat in order to be awarded points. Giving the correct answer verbally while wearing the wrong hat (or not wearing the hat at all) does not award points.
 Alphabet Soup (Season 2 [NA and UK]) - Each contestant is given four of alphabet symbols embedded in a liquid. Chudd's questions will have answers that begin with or have the same pronunciation as one of the letters of the alphabet. Contestants are only awarded points for presenting the correct letter of the alphabet; giving the correct answer verbally whilst holding the wrong letter does not award points. It was only played once in the Season 2 episode "Body Swap".
 Colourful Language (Season 3 [NA and UK]) - Each contestant has 4 boxes in front of them, each with a different colour. Chudd's questions will be about the colours written on the box. They have to give the colour written on the box, not the one coloured. It was only played once in the Season 3 episode "Pop Video".
 Throw If You Know (Seasons 2 and 3 [NA and UK]) - Each Contestant wears a big round hat with three balls, each with a different type, Chudd's questions will be about them. If they get it right, they have to throw the correct ball to Chudd. In the Season 3 episode "Amusement Park", the balls were replaced with moons, stars, and planets.
 Blindfold Buffet (Season 2 [NA and UK]) - In front of the contestants are five different foods/animals, which are answers to the questions that are answered. They have to pick up a handful of the right answer, then buzz in. However, all the contestants are blindfolded, so that they cannot see the food in front of them. Contestants are only awarded points for presenting the correct food; giving the correct answer verbally whilst holding the wrong food does not award points. This round is never played in the Skatoony studio, and it was played in the Season 2 episodes, "Space: The Final Souffle" and "Out to Sea".
 Cheery Tunes (Season 2 [NA and UK]) - You have to guess the tune of a nursery rhyme Earl plays. It was only played in the Season 2 episode "Pre-School Problem"'.
 Goldie Pops' Same Sound Name Round (Season 2 [NA and UK]) - Goldie Pops' personal game, which was only played in the Season 2 episode "Stop The Pop" to replace "Draw What You Hear, and Shout Out When You Know What You've Drawn!". Similar to Same Sound Name Round, except the three rhyming answers are in tanks of yucky sludge, and the contestants must pick the answers up with their teeth, like apple bobbing. It was called 'Goldie Pops' Deeply Dipping Game' in UK.
 Color Me Quizzy (Seasons 2 and 3 [NA and UK]) - The contestants have three boxes of colored paint in front of them. They have to dip their face in the correct color, then hit their buzzer. Contestants are only awarded points for the correct color that is on their face; giving the correct answer verbally whilst the wrong color paint is on their face does not award points. The children contestants (and cartoon contestants) wear goggles to protect their eyes. In the Season 3 episode "Cafe Le Quiz", they substituted the paint for mustard (yellow), barbecue sauce (brown), and mushy peas (green).
 Quick Pic Picking! (Season 2 [NA and UK]) - You have to guess the animal pic Chudd is describing. There's a roulette of animal pictures, and the players must buzz in when the roulette shows the right picture. Giving the correct answer verbally while stopping on the wrong picture does not award points. Chudd will continue his description until someone answers correctly. Players cannot buzz in for more than one question. It was only played once in the Season 2 episode "I Spy, You Quiz".
 Animal Swap-a-Butt (Seasons 2 and 3 [NA and UK]) - Fernando Fernando Fernando has his group of hybrid freaks. The contestants must guess the two correct animals, to earn a point. It was played in the episodes "Freakshow" and "In Your Dreams".
 Talkin' Backwords! (Season 3 [NA and UK]) - Chudd goes around the quizblock and asks each of the contestants a question in turn; but they have to give their answer back to front. Seen and played in the Season 3 episodes "CJ's Birthday" and "Follow that Quizblock".
 Blinking Brain Box (Season 3 [NA and UK]) - For this game, Chudd wears a helmet that shows his thoughts, but they are jumbled. The contestants must figure out what he is thinking of, they can earn up to five points, depending how fast they can figure out what Chudd is thinking and it made the easiest way to eliminate both toon contestants in each episode. This game was played in the Season 3 episodes "Quiz to the Future" and "Host of Doom".

Round 3 challenges
 Hoo Flung Dung! (All Seasons [NA and UK]) - In this round, Hoo, the "artistic gorilla", will throw his "paint" (though claimed to be dung by the round's title, on other occasions it is implied to be ordinary mud) onto a canvas. The "paint" will form into a particular shape, which the contestants must identify. A particular feature of this challenge is the fact that some of the "paint" is splattered on the contestants.
 DangerBox (Season 1 [NA and UK]) - Presented in front of each contestants are three boxes, each of which contains a particular type of food, be it something nice or nasty. Contestants must open a box and eat its contents before giving the answer to each question Chudd asks. Contestants may not pick a box more than once. Refusing to eat what's in a box will deny the contestant both the question and the points with it.
 Fast Food (Seasons 1 and 2 [NA and UK])- The contestants compete head to head in a speed quizzing challenge. Each contestant will have as much time as it takes for the other to consume a specified quantity of food.
 Egg Noggin! (All Seasons [NA and UK]) - Presented in front of each contestant is a row of eggs, some of which are raw and some of which are hard-boiled. The two contestants must listen to the general knowledge questions, and then buzz in when they know the answer. Contestants are awarded one point for each correct answer. Regardless of whether the contestant answers correctly or not, contestants must then select an egg and break it against their forehead. A bonus point is awarded if the egg chosen is hard-boiled, but if it is raw, the egg yolk will go all over their face! Enough eggs are provided so that neither contestant runs out of eggs.
 The DangerGrid of Doom (Seasons 2 and 3 [NA and UK]) - The DangerGrid of Doom is a huge robot with a panel of 12 numbers, each containing a nasty surprise such as drenching the contestant in various yucky goo or a deduction of points. Contestants answering correctly may choose one panel from the grid as a nasty surprise to unleash on their opponent. Conversely, contestants answering incorrectly are subject to a nasty surprise chosen by their opponent from the grid. In the Season 3 episode "Host of Doom", the Dangergrid of Doom was the new host/main antagonist of the episode, but his round was never played.
 Viking Flung Dung! (Season 2 [NA and UK]) - Same rules as Hoo Flung Dung, but only played in the Season 2 episode "Vikings".
 Stinky Drinky (Seasons 2 and 3 [NA and UK]) - Contestants have to answer general knowledge questions. If you get it right, your opponent has to drink one of the yucky drinks lined up in front of them. But get the question wrong, and you have to drink oneIf anyone refuses to drink, either they lose a point, or their opponent gets a bonus point, though this never happened in any episode. Just like Blindfold Buffet, this round is never played in the studio; it was played in a spooky cave, inside their boss' stomach, and out in the desert in the middle of nowhere.
 Mystery Pie Roulette (Seasons 3 [NA and UK]) - Contestants have to answer general knowledge questions. If you get it right, your opponent has to eat one of the pies lined up in front of them. Except there isn't mince in there at all, It's something horrid! But get the question wrong, and you have to eat a pie. In the UK it is called "Mince Pie Roulette".

Final Round challenges
 Skatoony Quiz Champ Challenge (all Seasons [NA and UK]) - At the end of three rounds, the remaining contestant takes on the Skatoony Quiz Champ Challenge, where they must answer ten questions correctly in 90 seconds.
 Earl's Halfway Deal (all Seasons [NA and UK]) - Halfway through the round the Earl will offer the contestant a deal. He will give the person extra points, however he will also take away some time. The player has a choice of whether to accept the deal or to reject it. The only time Earl doesn't offer a deal is either when a contestant has 8 points or more or if a contestant scores 10 points in under 45 seconds.
 Time to Play for a Prize! (Season 2 [NA and UK]) - The Tooskany version of the Skatoony Quiz Champ Challenge, seen in the Season 2 episode "Trash Talk".
 La-Re's Magical Middle Moment (Season 2 [NA and UK]) - The Tooskany version of Earl's Halfway Deal, seen in the Season 2 episode "Trash Talk".

Children elimination chart

Season 1

Season 2

Season 3

Seasonal episodes

List of episodes

Cartoon elimination chart

Season 1

Season 2

Season 3

References

External links
Skatoony NA on IMDb
Skatoony UK on IMDb
Skatoony Arabia on IMDb

2006 British television series debuts
2008 British television series endings
2006 Canadian television series debuts
2008 Canadian television series endings
2000s British game shows
2000s Canadian animated television series
2000s Canadian children's television series
2000s Canadian game shows
British children's animated comedy television series
British flash animated television series
British children's game shows
Canadian children's animated comedy television series
Canadian children's animated game shows
Canadian flash animated television series
English-language television shows
French-language television shows
Cartoon Network original programming
Teletoon original programming
Canadian television series with live action and animation
British television series with live action and animation